Ahmed Sylla (born 10 March 1990) is a French comedian and actor. In 2017, he received acclaim for his role in the film The Climb.

Background
Sylla's family originates from Senegal. He grew up on the Dervallières housing estate in Nantes and started to like theatre and comedy, motivated by his family who got him started.

Career
Sylla draws inspiration from leading French figures Louis de Funès, Raymond Devos  and Coluche, as well as Canadian artists such as Michel Courtemanche and Jim Carrey, whose humour is based on their body language.

In 2010, he joined the Samba Show and performed in prestigious concert halls such as the Casino de Paris and the Bobino theatre.

In 2011, he went to a casting for the Laurent Ruquier's TV show On n'demande qu'à en rire (literally, "all we ask is to laugh") on France 2 (French channel). After being selected, first as Ahmed Sarko, he found his feet. He achieved celebrity in France by creating scenarios where he dresses up as crazy characters.

In 2012, he presented his first one-man show "A mes délires!"

In 2016 he toured a new one-man show, "Ahmed Sylla avec un grand A".

One-man Show

Filmography

References

External links

IMDb

1990 births
French comedians
French people of Senegalese descent
Living people